First-seeded Simonne Mathieu defeated Nelly Adamson 6–0, 6–3 in the final to win the women's singles tennis title at the 1938 French Championships. Hilde Sperling was the three-time defending champion, but did not compete this year.

Seeds
The seeded players are listed below. Simonne Mathieu is the champion; others show the round in which they were eliminated.

 Simonne Mathieu (champion)
 Nancye Wynne Bolton (third round)
 Sylvie Henrotin (quarterfinals)
 Valerie Scott (second round)
 Arlette Halff (semifinals)
 Nell Hall Hopman (third round)
 Madzy Rollin Couquerque (semifinals)
 Esther Hein-Mueller (second round)

Draw

Key
 Q = Qualifier
 WC = Wild card
 LL = Lucky loser
 r = Retired

Finals

Earlier rounds

Section 1

Section 2

Section 3

Section 4

References

External links
 

1938 in women's tennis
1938
1938 in French women's sport
1938 in French tennis